The Republican National Committee (RNC) is a U.S. political committee that is the governing body of the Republican Party of the United States. It is responsible for developing and promoting the Republican brand and political platform, as well as assisting in fundraising and election strategy. It is also responsible for organizing and running the Republican National Convention.  When a Republican is president, the White House controls the committee. According to Boris Heersink, "political scientists have traditionally described the parties' national committees as inconsequential but impartial service providers."

Similar committees exist in every U.S. state and most U.S. counties, although in some states party organization is structured by congressional district, allied campaign organizations being governed by a national committee. Ronna McDaniel is the current committee chairwoman.

The RNC's main counterpart is the Democratic National Committee.

History
The 1856 Republican National Convention appointed the first RNC. It consisted of one member from each state and territory to serve for four years. Each national committee since then has followed the precedent of equal representation for each state or territory, regardless of population. From 1924 to 1952, there was a national committeeman and national committeewoman from each state and U.S. possession, and from Washington, D.C. In 1952, committee membership was expanded to include the state party chairs of states that voted Republican in the preceding presidential election, have a Republican majority in their congressional delegation (U.S. representatives and senators), or have Republican governors. By 1968, membership reached 145. As of 2011, the RNC has 168 members.

The only person to have chaired the RNC and later become U.S. president is George H. W. Bush. A number of the chairs of the RNC have been state governors.

In 2013, the RNC began an outreach campaign towards the American youth and minority voters, after studies showed these groups generally perceived that the Republican Party did not care about their concerns.

During the presidency of Donald Trump, the RNC showed staunch loyalty to President Trump, even at times when prominent Republicans did not. Under Ronna McDaniel's leadership, the RNC ran ads for Trump's 2020 campaign as early as 2018, put numerous Trump campaign workers and affiliates on the RNC payroll, spent considerable funds at Trump-owned properties, covered his legal fees in the Russian interference investigation, hosted Trump's Fake News Awards, and criticized Trump critics within the Republican Party. Two days after Trump was considered by many to have incited a pro-Trump mob to storm the U.S. Capitol, the RNC held an event where members expressed loyalty to the President.

In February 2022, the RNC censured two Republican representatives, Liz Cheney and Adam Kinzinger, for their participation in the United States House Select Committee to Investigate the January 6 Attack on the US Capitol; the censure statement described the committee as a "Democrat-led persecution of ordinary citizens who engaged in legitimate political discourse." The censure of sitting congressmembers, and particularly the description of the January 6 events as "legitimate political discourse", received bipartisan criticism from politicians and media.

Role

The Republican National Committee's main function is to assist the Republican Party of the United States. It helps to promote the Republican political platform and the "party brand" or image. It helps coordinate fundraising and election strategy.

It is also responsible for organizing and running the Republican National Convention.

Organization

The current chair of the Republican National Committee is Ronna McDaniel, serving since 2017. McDaniel was previously chair of the Michigan Republican Party from 2015 to 2017.

In January 2019, Thomas O. Hicks Jr. was elected co-chairman of the RNC. Hicks has a strong connection to President Trump's campaigns and policy initiatives, having served as chairman of the America First Action PAC and America First Policies, and as national finance co-chairman for Donald J. Trump for President.

Similar committees to the RNC exist in each U.S. state and most U.S. counties. The RNC also organizes volunteer groups for specific interests, such as the Black Republican Activists, GOP Hispanics, RNC Women (not to be confused with National Federation of Republican Women), GOP Faith, Asian Pacific Americans, Young Leaders and Veterans & Military Families.

Other National Leaders
 Treasurer: Kristin "KC" Crosbie, also on the RNC Executive Committee and Rules Committee
 Secretary: Vicki Drummond
 General Counsel: Michael Whatley
 Senate Republican Leader: Mitch McConnell
 Senate Republican Whip: John Thune
 Senate Republican Conference Chair: John Barrasso
 Senate Republican Conference Vice Chairwoman: Joni Ernst
 National Republican Senatorial Committee Chair: Steve Daines
 House Republican Leader: Kevin McCarthy
 House Republican Whip: Steve Scalise
 House Republican Conference Chairwoman: Elise Stefanik
 House Republican Policy Committee Chairman: Gary Palmer

Chairs of the Republican National Committee

Elections

1993 election

 Candidate won majority of votes in the round
 Candidate secured a plurality of votes in the round
 Candidate withdrew

1997 election

 Candidate won majority of votes in the round
 Candidate secured a plurality of votes in the round
 Candidate withdrew
 Merrill and Norcross both dropped out after the fifth round, giving the chairmanship to Nicholson by acclamation.

2009 election

On November 24, 2008, Steele launched his campaign for the RNC chairmanship with the launching of his website. On January 30, 2009, Steele won the chairmanship of the RNC in the sixth round, with 91 votes to Dawson's 77.

Source: CQPolitics, and Poll Pundit.

 Candidate won majority of votes in the round
 Candidate secured a plurality of votes in the round
 Candidate withdrew

On announcing his candidacy to succeed RNC Chairman Duncan, former Maryland Lt. Gov. Michael Steele described the party as being at a crossroads and not knowing what to do. "I think I may have some keys to open the door, some juice to turn on the lights," he said.

Six people ran for the 2009 RNC Chairmanship: Steele, Ken Blackwell, Mike Duncan, Saul Anuzis, Katon Dawson and Chip Saltsman. After Saltsman's withdrawal, there were only five candidates during the hotly contested balloting January 30, 2009.

After the third round of balloting that day, Steele held a small lead over incumbent Mike Duncan of Kentucky, with 51 votes to Duncan's 44. Shortly after the announcement of the standings, Duncan dropped out of contention without endorsing a candidate. Ken Blackwell, the only other African-American candidate, dropped out after the fourth ballot and endorsed Steele, though Blackwell had been the most socially conservative of the candidates and Steele had been accused of not being "sufficiently conservative."  Steele picked up Blackwell's votes. After the fifth round, Steele held a ten-vote lead over Katon Dawson, with 79 votes, and Saul Anuzis dropped out.  After the sixth vote, he won the chairmanship of the RNC over Dawson by a vote of 91 to 77.

Mississippi Governor and former RNC chair Haley Barbour has suggested the party will focus its efforts on congressional and gubernatorial elections in the coming years rather than the next presidential election. "When I was chairman of the Republican National Committee the last time we lost the White House in 1992 we focused exclusively on 1993 and 1994. And at the end of that time, we had both houses of Congress with Republican majorities, and we'd gone from 17 Republican governors to 31. So anyone talking about 2012 today doesn't have their eye on the ball. What we ought to worry about is rebuilding our party over the next year and particularly in 2010," Barbour said at the November 2008 Republican Governors conference.

2011 election

Michael Steele ran for re-election at the 2011 RNC winter meeting. Other candidates were Reince Priebus, Republican Party of Wisconsin Chairman,  Ann Wagner, former Ambassador to Luxembourg, Saul Anuzis, former Republican Party Chairman of Michigan, and Maria Cino, former acting Secretary of Transportation under George W. Bush. Steele's critics increasingly called on him to step down as RNC Chair when his term ended in 2011. A debate for Chairman hosted by  Americans for Tax Reform took place on January 3 at the National Press Club. The election for Chairman took place January 14 at the RNC's winter meeting with Reince Priebus winning on the seventh ballot after Steele and Wagner withdrew.

 Candidate won majority of votes in the round
 Candidate secured a plurality of votes in the round
 Candidate withdrew

2013–2023 elections
Priebus won re-election with near unanimity in the party's 2013 meeting in Charlotte, North Carolina.  He was re-elected to a third term in 2015, setting him up to become the longest serving head of the party ever.

After winning in November 2016, President-elect Donald Trump designated Priebus as his White House Chief of Staff, to begin upon his taking office in January 2017; David Bossie of Maryland was seen as a potential next RNC chairman.

Trump then recommended Ronna Romney McDaniel as RNC Chairwoman and she was elected to that role by the RNC in January 2017. McDaniel was re-elected in 2019 and 2021. Mike Lindell announced that he would challenge McDaniel in 2023. Lindell accused McDaniel of not denying the legitimacy of the 2020 presidential election forcefully enough, and criticized her for presiding over the RNC during three disappointing election years. McDaniel was re-elected in to a fourth term in January 2023, easily defeating Lindell and California RNC committeewoman Harmeet Dhillon.

Current Republican National Committee members
A collapsible list of the voting members of the Republican National Committee follows, . The state chair, national committeeman and national committeewoman each receive one vote at RNC meetings and vote for RNC Chairmanship.

Para Bellum Labs
In February 2014, during the chairmanship of Reince Priebus, the RNC launched an in-house technology incubator called Para Bellum Labs. This new unit of the RNC was first headed by Azarias Reda, an engineer with a PhD in computer science from the University of Michigan. The effort is designed to help the party and its candidates bridge the technology gap. Para Bellum, translated from Latin, means "prepare for war."

Federal "pay-to-play" investigation
In September 2019, McDaniel emailed Doug Manchester, whose nomination to become Ambassador to the Bahamas was stalled in the Senate, asking for $500,000 in donations to the Republican Party. Manchester responded, noting that his wife had given $100,000 and that his family would "respond" once he was confirmed by the Republican-led Senate to the ambassadorship. Manchester copied the email to aides of two U.S. senators whose support he needed to win confirmation. CBS News described McDaniel's action as a "possible pay-for-play scheme" for the ambassadorship. The San Diego Union-Tribune reported in May 2021 that a federal grand jury had issued a subpoena in a criminal investigation into Manchester's nomination, apparently focused on the RNC, McDaniel and RNC co-chair Tommy Hicks, "and possibly members of Congress". The Union-Tribune reported the investigation began in 2020.

See also

 Democratic National Committee
 Green National Committee
 Libertarian National Committee
 Republicans Overseas

References

Further reading
 Cotter, Cornelius P., and Bernard C. Hennessy, eds. Politics without Power: The National Party Committees (1964) excerpt
 Galvin, Daniel J. "The Transformation of Political Institutions: Investments in Institutional Resources and Gradual Change in the National Party Committees," Studies in American Political Development 26 (April 2012) 50–70; online
 Galvin, Daniel J. Presidential Party Building: Dwight D. Eisenhower to George W. Bush (Princeton UP, 2010).
 Goldman, Ralph M. The National party Chairmen and Committees: Factionalism at the Top (M.E. Sharpe, 1990)
 Heersink, Boris. "Examining Democratic and Republican National Committee Party Branding Activity, 1953–2012." Perspectives on Politics (2021): 1–18.
 Heersink, Boris. "Trump and the party-in-organization: Presidential control of national party organizations." [ Journal of Politics 80.4 (2018): 1474–1482. online
 Heersink, Boris. "Party Brands and the Democratic and Republican National Committees, 1952–1976." Studies in American Political Development 32.1 (2018): 79–102. online
 Hejny, Jessica, and Adam Hilton. "Bringing contention in: a critical perspective on political parties as institutions." Studies in Political Economy 102.2 (2021): 161–181.
 Hennessy, Bernard C. "The Republican National Committee and Party Policy, 1920-1963." in Politics Without Power (Routledge, 2017) pp. 191–210.
 Herrnson, Paul S. "The Evolution of National Party Organizations," in The Oxford Handbook of American Political Parties and Interest Groups, edited by Louis Sandy Maisel and Jeffrey M. Berry. (Oxford University Press, 2010) pp. 245–264.
 Klinkner, Philip A. The Losing Parties: Out-Party National Committees, 1956-1993 (Yale University Press, 1994)
 Pavlov, Eugene, and Natalie Mizik. "Brand Political Positioning: Implications of the 2016 US Presidential Election." Available at SSRN 3696652 (2020). online

External links
 Official Website
 Republican National Committee: News clippings and publications, 1932-65, Dwight D. Eisenhower Presidential Library
 Para Bellum Labs 

 
1856 establishments in the United States
Executive committees of political parties
Political parties established in 1856
National Committee